Mikołaj Jerzy Czartoryski (1585–1662) of Czartoryski coat of arms was a Polish–Lithuanian Commonwealth noble and politician, born in Klevan. Member of the Czartoryski family. Castellan of Wołyń (Volhyia) from 1633. Voivode of Podolia (1655), voivode of Wołyń (1657).

His marriage to Izabella Korecka was a significant boost to the wealth of his family.

Ancestry 

1585 births
1662 deaths
People from Rivne Oblast
Mikolaj Jerzy